In enzymology, a 3alpha-hydroxysteroid dehydrogenase (A-specific) is an enzyme that catalyzes the chemical reaction

androsterone + NAD(P)+  5alpha-androstane-3,17-dione + NAD(P)H + H+

The 3 substrates of this enzyme are androsterone, NAD+, and NADP+, whereas its 4 products are 5alpha-androstane-3,17-dione, NADH, NADPH, and H+.

This enzyme belongs to the family of oxidoreductases, specifically those acting on the CH-OH group of donor with NAD+ or NADP+ as acceptor, more specifically it is part of the group of hydroxysteroid dehydrogenases. The systematic name of this enzyme class is 3alpha-hydroxysteroid:NAD(P)+ oxidoreductase (A-specific).

Structural studies

References

 
 

EC 1.1.1
NADPH-dependent enzymes
NADH-dependent enzymes
Enzymes of known structure